Ametadoria abdominalis is a species of tachinid flies in the genus Ametadoria of the family Tachinidae. It was originally placed in the genus Abolodoria, where it was the type (and only) species of the genus; Abolodoria was later found to be a synonym of Ametadoria in 2015.

References

Exoristinae
Taxa named by Charles Henry Tyler Townsend
Insects described in 1934
Diptera of South America